Vallipuram is a village in Vadamarachchi, near Point Pedro in Northern Province, Sri Lanka. The village is an ancient settlement with rich archeological remains. The village is home to the Vishnu temple Vallipuram Aalvar Kovil.

History
A 2nd century gold plate carrying a Sinhala Prakrit inscription was found under the foundation of the Vishnu Hindu temple at Vallipuram. It mentions about the establishment of a Vihara in Nakadiva by the minister named Isigiraya under the ruler King Vaha who is identified as King Vasabha (67-111 C.E.). The inscription is important as it confirms that King Vasabha was ruling the whole country including Nakadiva (Nakadiva in Old Sinhala is the equivalent of Pali Nagadipa, whilst the use of the phoneme 'k' to represent 'g' reveals Dravidian influence).

The language and interpretation of the inscription is disputed. According to Senarath Paranavithana, this is an inscription written in Old Sinhalese. Peter Schalk believes that this inscription is in Prakrit bearing Dravidian influences and that the name Nakadiva is a fiefdom corresponding to modern Jaffna Peninsula, which was ruled under the minister Isikiraya ('raya' being a Tamil form of the word raja, and the place name 'Badakara' (vada karai - Tamil) deriving from the Dravidian 'northern coast').

The exact details of the temple complex are not known, and the famous Vallipuram Buddha statue from the 3rd–4th century AD built in the Amaravathi style was found under the Vallipuram temple. This cultural exchange between the Jaffna peninsula and Andhra Pradesh occurred at the height of trade in the Sangam period, continuing when the Telugu Satavahana dynasty was at the height of its power from 230 BC right through when its 17th monarch Hāla (20-24 AD) married a princess from the island. Professor Peter Schalk (University of Uppsala), writes "Vallipuram has very rich archaeological remains that point at an early settlement. It was probably an emporium in the first centuries AD. […]. The Buddha statue found here was given to King of Thailand by the then British Governor Henry Blake in 1906.

Gallery

See also
Kantharodai
Nallur (Jaffna)
Naguleswaram temple
Nainativu
Ubayakathirgamam

Notes

References

External links

 Indonesian History
Invasions by Chinese, Indonesians and Pandyans
A Brief History of Jaffna Kingdom 
The Vallipuram Buddha Image

Buddhism amongst Tamils
Towns in Jaffna District
Vadamarachchi North DS Division